Lecithocera pogonikuma is a moth in the family Lecithoceridae. It was described by Chun-Sheng Wu and Kyu-Tek Park in 1999. It is found in Sri Lanka.

The wingspan is about 8 mm. The forewings are light ochreous yellow, apically confused ochreous brown and with the discal spot dark brown. The hindwings are ochreous.

Etymology
The species name is derived from Greek pogon (meaning beard).

References

Moths described in 1999
pogonikuma